Blue Velvet Revisited is a 2016 documentary film, directed and edited by Peter Braatz. Using a montage technique, it documents the making of David Lynch's critically acclaimed film,  Blue Velvet, using a combination of filmed footage, photographs and interviews captured on set by Braatz, with an accompanying soundtrack by Cult With No Name, Tuxedomoon and John Foxx.

Background and production 
Peter Braatz had worked as a musician fronting the German avant-garde punk band S.Y.P.H. before moving to Berlin in the early eighties to study film. He first made contact with Lynch in 1983, sending a critique on Lynch's The Elephant Man with a proposal to interview him to Mel Brooks, who had produced the film. Lynch wrote back several months later and they exchanged letters over the following two years. In 1985, and out of the blue, Lynch invited Braatz to document the making of his new film in Wilmington, North Carolina, which became Blue Velvet. Braatz traveled with a friend and stayed on set for 3 months, taking only Super 8 cameras and reels (due to cost and weight), a tape recorder and a camera. Lynch granted Braatz unrestricted access to the set, cast and crew, with only some restrictions placed on where Braatz could film Isabella Rossellini as she was still under contract to Lancome.

Braatz first released a film based on what he documented as No Frank in Lumberton in 1988. The film was avant-garde in its approach and had only limited distributed through German television station ZDF and a handful of festivals. In 2013, Braatz was in his studio listening to the track "As Below" by British band Cult With No Name and was inspired to revisit his footage and put together a proposal based around this piece of music for a new film using his archived Blue Velvet footage. Funding for the film was provided by the German Film Foundation and the Slovenian Bela-Film.

Before editing began, Braatz commissioned Cult With No Name to produce the soundtrack, as it was always his intention to edit to music as much of his material was silent having been filmed using Super 8. Cult With No Name invited Tuxedomoon and John Foxx to join them in producing the soundtrack, which was released on Crammed Discs in 2015 on vinyl and CD, a whole year before the film. The soundtrack received significant press coverage and was met with extremely positive reviews, The Wire describing it as "... evocative, dreamy, dark and dynamic." The CD included a booklet of previously unreleased photographs taken on set. "No News", the song that closes Blue Velvet Revisited and did not appear on the soundtrack, was subsequently released by the Cult With No Name on their Heir of the Dog album in 2017.

Editing and production of the film took over a year in total. Opening titles and chapter titles for the film were provided by acclaimed graphic designer Jonathan Barnbrook, most famous for his work with David Bowie. Braatz himself dubbed the film "a meditation on a movie", making an important distinction between his approach and a conventional documentary with narration.

Release  
Blue Velvet Revisited was premiered at the Institute of Contemporary Arts as part of the BFI London Film Festival on 7 October 2016. This coincided with the 30th anniversary of the release of the original film. the next day, and at Lynch's request, the film received its US premiere at the Lynch's Festival of Disruption. The screening was followed by a Q+A with Laura Dern and Kyle MacLachlan. Since then the film has appeared a large number of notable festivals, galleries and cinemas worldwide, including CPH:DOX, Doc NYC, and MALBA.

In February 2019, The Criterion Collection announced a deluxe reissue of Blue Velvet on DVD and Blu-ray with Blue Velvet Revisited included as an extra.

In 2020, the track "Lumberton" from the soundtrack of Blue Velvet Revisited, was licensed to be used in the HBO series The New Pope, starring Jude Law and John Malkovich.

Reception 
The film has gained positive reviews, with a current Rotten Tomatoes rating of 71%. The Hollywood Reporter described the film as "... a quietly mesmerizing sensory experience, with a distinctive rhythm and look that makes it a stand-alone artwork rather than a mimetic mirror of its subject." Sam Gray of The Upcoming went further and commented, "with a terrific soundtrack and its insightful, rare footage, Blue Velvet Revisited is nirvana for Lynch nerds; though even those with a perfunctory interest in filmmaking could do with seeing this fascinating gem."

References

External links
 
 Homepage for Cult With No Name

2016 films
2016 documentary films
David Lynch